That Woman is a 1922 American silent drama film directed by Harry O. Hoyt and starring Catherine Calvert, William Black and William Ricciardi.

Synopsis
When the a star Broadway actress marries the son of a wealthy New York family, his father does everything he can to try and split the couple up. Eventually convinced of her worthiness, he changes his mind and gives them his blessing.

Cast
 Catherine Calvert as 	Adora Winstanley
 Joseph Bruelle as 	William Arnold Kelvin
 William Black as 	William Kelvin
 George Pauncefort as Somerton Randall
 William Ricciardi as Morris Elman
 Jack Newton as Hilary Weston
 Norbert Wicki as 	Mishu
 Grace Field 
 Guy Coombs	
 Ralph Bunker

References

Bibliography
 Munden, Kenneth White. The American Film Institute Catalog of Motion Pictures Produced in the United States, Part 1. University of California Press, 1997.

External links

1922 films
1922 drama films
Silent American drama films
Films directed by Harry O. Hoyt
American silent feature films
1920s English-language films
American black-and-white films
1920s American films
English-language drama films